Black River Entertainment is an independent record label in Nashville, Tennessee, specializing in country music. The company is a partially owned subsidiary of Pegula Sports and Entertainment, which otherwise specializes primarily in professional sports team ownership in western New York (including the Buffalo Bills, Buffalo Sabres, Buffalo Bandits, Buffalo Beauts, and Rochester Americans). The label’s roster includes Kelsea Ballerini and she is the label’s main focus. The company also contains Black River Publishing and Sound Stage Studio both out of Nashville.

Background 
Black River Entertainment was started in late 2007 by Nashville session musician Jimmy Nichols (James Ginnetti), his wife Tonya Cochran Ginnetti, and Pennsylvania-based oil magnates Terry and Kim Pegula.  Black River's first signing was former RCA recording artist, Jeff Bates, who had previously reached the Billboard top 40  with three of his songs. Label president Jimmy Nichols (along with Kenny Beard and Mickey Jack Cones) produced Bates' self-titled album that was released in April 2008.

During preparation for Bates' release, Black River began their search for their next potential artist. Singer/songwriter Sarah Darling was discovered via her MySpace music page. Darling had already made her name known to the public when she was a finalist on E! Entertainment Television's reality show The Entertainer, hosted by Wayne Newton. The label signed Darling and moved into the studio in the summer of 2008 to record her debut album, Every Monday Morning (released on June 16, 2009). Her single, "Jack of Hearts" successfully made its debut on CMT's top 20 countdown. Darling's first top-40 country hit (and the label's second), "Home to Me," peaked in fall 2012, after which she left the label.

After much success with two artists, they signed their third, Emma Jacob, in February 2009. Nichols produced her album, along with her manager, Lex Lipsitz, who also manages Kate and Kacey. Black River does the majority of their recording in the studio "Ronnie's Place" which is located in their building in Nashville. It was previously owned by Ronnie Milsap.

Black River signed Craig Morgan in 2011. Morgan, who has compiled fifteen top-40 singles on the country charts over the course of his career, had previously been with BNA Records, Broken Bow Records and Atlantic Records prior to joining Black River. Morgan gave Black River its first single ("This Ole Boy") to reach the Top 40 of Billboard'''s Hot Country Singles chart.

On October 8, 2012, CMT reported that American Idol alumni Kellie Pickler had signed with the label, and had already begun working with her on her fourth studio album. The Woman I Am was released on November 11, 2013.

In January 2013, Black River Entertainment added The John King Band to the roster. In December 2013, the label added Kelsea Ballerini to their roster, and released her debut single, "Love Me Like You Mean It," in 2014. It serves as the lead-off single to her debut album, The First Time, which was released on May 19, 2015. "Love Me Like You Mean It" reached number one on the Billboard'' Country Airplay chart for the week ending July 4, 2015, giving Black River their first number-one hit on that chart and also earning the label the distinction of being the first independent label to bring a female artist's debut single to the top of the country chart; they are also the first independent label to have a female artist at number one since Taylor Swift's "Ours" led in December 2012.

Ballerini's song "Half of My Hometown," a collaboration with Kenny Chesney, won the Video of the Year and Musical Event of the Year at the 55th Annual Country Music Association Awards in 2021.

Notable artists

Black River Records 
Kelsea Ballerini

Former Black River Records artists

Abby Anderson
Jeff Bates
Bobby Bones and the Raging Idiots
Sarah Darling
Due West
John King
Ronnie Milsap
Craig Morgan
Kellie Pickler
Glen Templeton

Black River Christian
 Matty Mullins
 Josh Wilson

Former Black River Christian artists
 Hannah Kerr

References

External links
 

American independent record labels
American country music record labels
Christian record labels
Pegula Sports and Entertainment
Record labels based in Tennessee